The 1879–80 Home Nations rugby union matches were a series of international rugby union friendlies held between the England, Ireland and Scotland national rugby union teams.

The only recognised competition held between the countries was the annual Calcutta Cup match, contested between England and Scotland. It was the second challenge for the Cup.

Results

Scoring system
The matches for this season were decided on goals scored. A goal was awarded for a successful conversion after a try, for a dropped goal or for a goal from mark. If a game was drawn, any unconverted tries were tallied to give a winner. If there was still no clear winner, the match was declared a draw.

The matches

Ireland vs. England

Ireland RB Walkington (NIFC), AM Whitestone (Dublin University), JC Bagot (Dublin University), WT Heron (NIFC), M Johnston (Dublin University), AJ Forrest (Wanderers), F Kennedy (Wanderers), A Millar (Kingstown), HC Kelly (NIFC) capt., JW Taylor (NIFC), JA McDonald (Wanderers), JL Cuppaidge (Wanderers), RW Hughes (NIFC), G Scriven (Dublin University), HH Purdon (NIFC) 
 
England TW Fry (Queen's House), AN Hornby (Manchester), L Stokes (Blackheath) capt., R Hunt (Manchester), HT Twynam (Richmond), AH Jackson (Blackheath), S Neame (Old Cheltonians), Charles Gurdon (Richmond), B Kilner (Wakefield Trinity), GF Vernon (Blackheath), E Woodhead (Dublin University), SS Ellis (Queen's House), HC Rowley (Manchester), E Markendale (Manchester Rangers), JW Schofield (Manchester Rangers)

Scotland vs. Ireland

Scotland Bill Maclagan (Edinburgh Academical), Malcolm Cross (Glasgow Academical), Ninian Finlay (Edinburgh Academical), WH Masters (Edinburgh Inst. F.P.), WS Brown (Edinburgh Inst. F.P.), Robert Ainslie (Edinburgh Inst. F.P.), CAR Stewart (West of Scotland), JB Brown (Glasgow Academical), EN Ewart (Glasgow Academical), RW Irvine (Edinburgh Academical) capt., AG Petrie (Royal HSFP), JHS Graham (Edinburgh Academical), D McCowan (West of Scotland), NT Brewis (Edinburgh Inst. F.P.), John Guthrie Tait (Edinburgh Academical)

Ireland RB Walkington (NIFC), T Harrison (Queen's College, Cork), JC Bagot (Dublin University), WT Heron (NIFC), M Johnston (Dublin University), AJ Forrest (Wanderers), AP Cronyn, A Millar (Kingstown), HC Kelly (NIFC) capt., JW Taylor (NIFC), WL Finlay (NIFC), JL Cuppaidge (Wanderers), RW Hughes (NIFC), G Scriven (Dublin University), WA Wallis (Dublin University)

England vs. Scotland

England TW Fry (Queen's House), C. M. Sawyer (Broughton), L Stokes (Blackheath) capt., RT Finch (Cambridge University), HH Taylor (St. George's Hospital), CH Coates  (Cambridge University), S Neame (Old Cheltonians), Charles Gurdon (Richmond), C Phillips (Oxford University), GF Vernon (Blackheath), G Harrison (Hull), George Burton (Blackheath), HC Rowley (Manchester), ET Gurdon (Richmond), Roger Walker (Manchester) 
 
Scotland Bill Maclagan (Edinburgh Academical), Malcolm Cross (Glasgow Academical), Ninian Finlay (Edinburgh Academical), WH Masters (Edinburgh Inst. F.P.), WS Brown (Edinburgh Inst. F.P.), Robert Ainslie (Edinburgh Inst. F.P.), CAR Stewart (West of Scotland), JB Brown (Glasgow Academical), EN Ewart (Glasgow Academical), RW Irvine (Edinburgh Academical) capt., AG Petrie (Royal HSFP), JHS Graham (Edinburgh Academical), D McCowan (West of Scotland), NT Brewis (Edinburgh Inst. F.P.), DY Cassels (West of Scotland)

Bibliography

References

History of rugby union matches between England and Scotland
History of rugby union matches between England and Ireland
History of rugby union matches between Ireland and Scotland
England national rugby union team matches
Scotland national rugby union team matches
Ireland national rugby union team matches
1879–80 in British rugby union
1880 in English sport
1880 in Scottish sport
rugby union